The 2016 IIHF Women's World Championship Division I was two international ice hockey tournaments organised by the International Ice Hockey Federation. The Division I Group A tournament was played in Aalborg, Denmark, from 25 to 31 March 2016, and the Division I Group B tournament was played in Asiago, Italy, from 4 to 10 April 2016.

Venues

Division I Group A

Participants

Match officials
4 referees and 7 linesmen were selected for the tournament.

Referees
 Henna Aberg
 Deana Cuglietta
 Katie Guay
 Yana Zueva

Linesmen
 Liv Andersson
 Magali Anex
 Marine Dinant
 Jamie Fenstermacher
 Amy Lack
 Trine Phillipsen
 Michaela Štefková

Final standings

Results
All times are local (Until 26 March UTC+1 and from 28 March on UTC+2).

Awards and statistics

Awards
Best players selected by the directorate:
 Best Goalkeeper:  Caroline Baldin
 Best Defenseman:  Josefine Hansen
 Best Forward:  Laura Kluge
Source: IIHF.com

Scoring leaders
List shows the top skaters sorted by points, then goals.

GP = Games played; G = Goals; A = Assists; Pts = Points; +/− = Plus/minus; PIM = Penalties in minutes; POS = Position
Source: IIHF.com

Leading goaltenders
Only the top five goaltenders, based on save percentage, who have played at least 40% of their team's minutes, are included in this list.

TOI = Time on ice (minutes:seconds); SA = Shots against; GA = Goals against; GAA = Goals against average; Sv% = Save percentage; SO = Shutouts
Source: IIHF.com

Division I Group B

Participants

Match officials
4 referees and 7 linesmen were selected for the tournament.

Referees
 Nikoleta Celárová
 Maija Kontturi
 Lacey Senuk
 Ramona Weiss

Linesmen
 Anina Egli
 Mirjam Gruber
 Michaela Kúdeľová
 Anne-Ruth Kuonen
 Joanna Pobożniak
 Jodi Price
 Svenja Strohmenger

Final standings

Results
All times are local (UTC+2).

Awards and statistics

Awards
Best players selected by the directorate:
 Best Goalkeeper:  Anikó Németh
 Best Defenseman:  Bernadett Németh
 Best Forward:  Alyona Fux
Source: IIHF.com

Scoring leaders
List shows the top skaters sorted by points, then goals.

GP = Games played; G = Goals; A = Assists; Pts = Points; +/− = Plus/minus; PIM = Penalties in minutes; POS = Position
Source: IIHF.com

Leading goaltenders
Only the top five goaltenders, based on save percentage, who have played at least 40% of their team's minutes, are included in this list.

TOI = Time on ice (minutes:seconds); SA = Shots against; GA = Goals against; GAA = Goals against average; Sv% = Save percentage; SO = Shutouts
Source: IIHF.com

References

External links
Official website of IIHF

Division I
2016
2016 IIHF Women's World Championship Division I
2016 IIHF Women's World Championship Division I
IIHF Women's World Championship Division I
IIHF Women's World Championship Division I
2016 IIHF Women's World Championship Division I